Centaurea sphaerocephala is a species of Centaurea found in the Iberian Peninsula.

References

External links

sphaerocephala
Plants described in 1753
Taxa named by Carl Linnaeus